Belonolaimus gracilis (pine sting nematode) is a plant pathogenic nematode.

References

External links 
 Nemaplex, University of California - Belonolaimus gracilis

Tylenchida
Agricultural pest nematodes